Rucumilla was an H-class submarine of the Chilean Navy. The vessel was originally ordered by the United Kingdom's Royal Navy as HMS H17, but was handed over to Chile in 1917 as H3.

Career 
H17 was a H-class submarine built by Fore River Yard of Quincy, Massachusetts. She was launched on 26 July 1915. As a result, H17 was never commissioned into the Royal Navy. Instead, she and H13, H16, H18, H19, and H20 were transferred to the Chilean Navy as partial recompensation for the appropriation of two 28,000-ton dreadnoughts ( and ). Originally named H3 when turned over to Chile in 1917, she was renamed Rucumilla in 1924.

Training accident 
On 2 June 1919 Rucumilla began a naval exercise near of the Talcahuano Naval Base, under the command of Capitán de Corbeta Arístides Del Solar Morel. As she began to submerge into the water, a valve for the battery ventilator was left open and allowed the boat to flood.

The batteries were submerged in sea water and chlorine gas was beginning to fill the boat, short circuits caused small fires and the boat was in complete darkness. Captain Del Solar lead the crew to the forward torpedo room, where he believed the rescue would come from and used compressed air, in prudent quantities, to keep the air nearly breathable.

A submarine communication buoy was released by Rucumilla, but it was not freed because of the inclination of the submarine. Divers of the Navy could freed the buoy and heavier cables were attached to the bow of the boat.

At 14:00 the largest cranes (180, 60 and 30 t) were moved into position and slowly Rucumilla and her twenty five survivors began to rise. The cables, while under great strain, held and at 17:00, seven hours after she had gone down, the bow of Rucumilla broke the surface.

The probe of the accident found that a valve with a rare left hand thread type caused confusion among the crew.

The operation was a complete success recovering the twenty five men alive and the boat as well.

Naval Mutiny 1931

During the mutiny, the officers of Rucumilla tried to attack the mutineers' ships. Near the Quiriquina Island Rucumilla was chased by the tug  and eventually was forced to withdraw to the Bío Bío River.

She served with the Chilean Navy until she was stricken in 1945.

References

 
 Chilean site Revista de Marina, Recordando al submarino H-3 Rucumilla by Carlos Martín Fritz, retrieved on 20 December 2012.
 Maritime quest, Rucumilla by Michael W. Pocock, retrieved on 20 December 2012.
 Chilean site Revista de Marina, Prisioneros bajo el agua: el hundimiento del submarino H-3 by Julio Allard Pinto, retrieved on 1 January 2013.

British H-class submarines
Ships built in Quincy, Massachusetts
1915 ships
World War I submarines of the United Kingdom
British H-class submarines of the Chilean Navy
World War II submarines of Chile
Maritime incidents in 1919